Pityriasis lichenoides is a form of pityriasis.

Types include:
 Pityriasis lichenoides et varioliformis acuta
 Pityriasis lichenoides chronica

References

External links 

 

Lymphoid-related cutaneous conditions